U.S. Catanzaro 1929 is an Italian football club based in Catanzaro, Calabria. The club was officially formed in 1929. Catanzaro has competed in the Serie A seven times and were one time Coppa Italia runners-up.

The list encompasses the honours won by U.S. Catanzaro 1929 at national and regional level, records set by the club, their managers and their players. The player records section itemises the club's leading goalscorers and those who have made the most appearances in first-team competitions. It also records notable achievements by Catanzaro players on the international stage.

Catanzaro have won 6 interregional level three titles and 1 interregional level four title. The club's record league appearances maker is Adriano Banelli, who made 336 appearances between 1967 and 1979 and the club's record Serie A appearance maker is Claudio Ranieri with 128 appearances. Massimo Palanca is the club's record goalscorer, scoring 116 goals in total.

All figures are correct as of 16 November 2021.

Honours and achievements

National

Leagues 
 Serie B (Level 2)
Runners-Up (2): 1975–76, 1977–78
Promoted via play-offs (1): 1970–71
 Supercoppa di Serie C (Level 3)
Runners-Up (1): 2004
 Scudetto IV Serie (Level 4)
Winners (1): 1952–53

Cups 
 Coppa Italia
Runners-Up (1): 1965–66
Semi-finalists (2): 1978–79, 1981–82

Interregional 
 Prima Divisione or Serie C or Serie C1 (Level 3)
Winners (6): 1932–33 (Prima Div/I), 1935–36 (Serie C/D), 1958–59 (Serie C/B), 1984–85 (Serie C1/B), 1986–87 (Serie C1/B), 2003–04 (Serie C1/B)
Runners–Up (4): 1945–46, 1947–48, 2020–21, 2021–22 
 IV Serie or Serie C2/Lega Pro Seconda Divisione (Level 4)
Winners (1): 1952–53 (IV Serie/H)
Runners-Up (2): 2009–10, 2011–12 (LP Seconda Div)
Promotion (1): 2002–03 (Serie C2)

Regional 
 Prima Divisione 
Winners (2): 1938–39, 1939–40
Runners-Up (1): 1937–38

European 
 Cup of the Alps
 Winners (1): 1960

Notes

Player records

Appearances

 Most league appearances: Adriano Banelli, 336
 Most Serie A appearances: Claudio Ranieri, 128
 Most Coppa Italia appearances: Adriano Banelli, 39
 Youngest first-team player: Domenico Strumbo, 16 years, 9 months, 12 days on 20 November 2017

Most appearances
Competitive matches only, includes appearances as substitute.

{| class="sortable wikitable plainrowheaders"  style="text-align: center;"
|-
! scope="col" style="width:4%;" |#
! scope="col" style="width:14%;"|Name
! scope="col" style="width:14%;"|Years
! scope="col" style="width:10%;"|League (Serie A)
! scope="col" style="width:10%;"|Coppa Italia
! scope="col" style="width:10%;"|Other
! scope="col" style="width:10%;"|Total
|-
|1
! scope="row" | 
| 1967–1979
| 336 (66)
| 39
| 3 
| 378
|-
|2
! scope="row" | 
| 1974–19811986–1990
| 332 (105)
| 36
| 1
| 369
|-
|3
! scope="row" | 
| 1955–1966
| 313 (0)
| 2
| 
| 315
|-
|4
! scope="row" | 
| 1967–1977
| 244 (45)
| 27
| 3
| 274
|-
|5
! scope="row" | 
| 1974–1982
| 225 (128)
| 27
| 1
| 253
|-
|6
! scope="row" | 
| 1963–1969
| 224 (0)
| 14
| 
| 238
|-
|7
! scope="row" | | 1960–1968
| 221 (0)
| 9
| 
| 230|-
|8
! scope="row" | 
| 1971–1978
| 206 (45)
| 22
| 1
| 229|-
|9
! scope="row" | 
| 1967–1977
| 197 (39)
| 26
| 2
| 225|-
|10
! scope="row" | 
| 1965–1971
| 202 (0)
| 16
| 1
| 219'|}

Goalscorers
 Most goals in a season: 
 Vincenzo Geraci, 22 in the 1947–48 Catanzaro season
 Gianni Bui, 22 in the 1965–66 Catanzaro season
 Most league goals in a season: 
 Vincenzo Geraci, 21 in the 1947–48 Serie C and the 1950–51 Serie C seasons 
 Simone Masini, 21 in the 2011–12 Lega Pro Seconda Divisione season
 First Serie A goalscorer: Alberto Spelta, in the 1971–72 season against Juventus
 Youngest goalscorer: Maurizio Pellegrino, 18 years, 3 months, 5 days (against U.S. Triestina, Serie B, 3 June 1984)
 Oldest goalscorer: Domenico Giampa, 38 years, 8 months, 30 days (against S.S. Racing Club Roma, Serie C, 14 November 2015)

Top goalscorersCompetitive matches only. Numbers in brackets indicate appearances.This list may not be completely exhaustive of all matches in all competitions. Data is missing for league competitions from founding in 1929 to 1959. Data is also missing for 12 seasons: 1986–87, 1984–85, 2006–07, and between 1990 to 1992, and 1996 to 2003.
Where a player has missing data from the source, numbers have been adjusted using additional references.

 Capocannonieri 
Below is a list of Catanzaro players who were the top goalscorers of the league or cup during a season, known as the Capocannonieri in Italian. The number corresponds to the numbers of goals scored followed by the season and league or cup this achievement was accomplished.

 League 

 Cup 

 Serie A records 
Below is a list of players with the top 10 appearances and goals scored in the Italian top flight competition, the Serie A.

 Appearances 

 Goals 

Managerial records

 First full-time manager: Dino Baroni
 First Serie A manager: Gianni Seghedoni in the 1971–72 Serie A season. 
 Longest serving manager: Orlando Tognotti — 4 years (1 July 1952 to 30 June 1956). 
 Longest serving Serie A manager: Carlo Mazzone – 1 year, 8 months, 30 days (1 July 1978 to 30 March 1980).
 Highest win percentage: Gaetano Auteri, 65.79% 
 Lowest win percentage: Vincenzo Guerini, Bruno Bolchi, both 0.00%

 Club records 

 Matches 
 First Serie A match: Juventus 4–2 Catanzaro, 30 October 1971.
 First Serie A win: 1–0 against Juventus, Round 16, 30 January 1972.

 Record wins 
 Record league win: 10–0 against Cagliari, Serie B, 25 February 1934
 Record Coppa Italia win: 6–0 against Benevento, 27 October 1935

Record defeats
 Record league defeat: 5-goal margin
 1–6 on two occasions
 0–5 on seven occasions 
 Record Coppa Italia defeat: 0–6 against Sorrento, 2010–11 First Round, 8 August 2010

Goals
 Most league goals scored in a season: 66 in 40 matches, Lega Pro Seconda Divisione, 2011–12
 Fewest league goals scored in a season: 15 in 30 matches, Lega Pro Seconda Divisione, 2010–11
 Most league goals conceded in a season: 82 in 42 matches, Serie B, 2004–05
 Fewest league goals conceded in a season: 15 in 34 matches, Serie C, 1958–59

Points
 Most points in a season (2-point wins): 
 47 in 34 matches, Serie C, 1958–59
 47 in 38 matches, Serie B, 1970–71
 Most points in a season (3-point wins): 83 in 40 matches, Lega Pro Seconda Divisione, 2011–12
 Fewest points in a season (2-point wins): 13 in 30 matches, Serie A, 1982–83
 Fewest points in a season (3-point wins): 11 in 30 matches, Lega Pro Seconda Divisione, 2010–11 Lega Pro Seconda Divisione

AttendancesSerie A matches only.''
 Highest home attendance: 28,942, against Juventus, Round 30, 16 May 1982.
 Lowest home attendance: 4,328, against Lazio, Round 30, 22 May 1977.

All-time records

All domestic competitions

See also
 List of U.S. Catanzaro 1929 seasons

Notes

References

External links
 Official website

Records and statistics
Catanzaro